Denis Yuryevich Fladung (born 20 February 1979) is a former Russian professional football player.

Club career
He played in the Russian Football National League for FC Spartak Chelyabinsk in 2005.

References

External links
 

1979 births
Living people
Russian footballers
Association football midfielders
FC Torpedo Miass players
FC Metallurg Lipetsk players
FC Zvezda Irkutsk players
FC Spartak Nizhny Novgorod players
FC Amur Blagoveshchensk players